The 3rd Politburo of the Communist Party of Cuba (PCC) was elected in 1986 by the 1st Plenary Session of the 3rd Central Committee, in the immediate aftermath of the 3rd Party Congress.

Members

Alternate members

References

Specific

Bibliography
Articles and journals:
 

3rd Politburo of the Communist Party of Cuba
1986 establishments in Cuba
1991 disestablishments in Cuba